Rolv is a given name. Notable people with the given name include:

Rolv Petter Amdam (born 1953), Norwegian economic historian
Rolv Enge (1921–2014), Norwegian resistance member and architect
Rolv Werner Erichsen (1899–1988), Norwegian newspaper editor
Rolv Eriksrud (born 1978), Norwegian ski mountaineer and cross-country skier
Rolv Hellesylt (born 1927), Norwegian judge
Rolv Henden (1914–1992), Norwegian businessperson and resistance member
Rolv Høiland (1926–2001), Norwegian magazine editor
Rolv Ryssdal (1914–1998), Norwegian judge
Rolv Thesen (1896–1966), Norwegian poet, literary researcher and literary critic
Rolv Yttrehus (1926–2018), American composer
Rolv Wesenlund (1936–2013), Norwegian comedian, singer, clarinetist, writer and actor

See also
Rolf